The title Earl Fife was a title in the Peerage of Ireland  created by letters patent dated 26 April 1759 for William Duff (1696–1763) after asserting (but not proving) his descent from Macduff, the medieval Earl of Fife. Though in the Irish peerage, the title implies a connection with Fife in Scotland.

History
William Duff, 1st Earl Fife, had previously been created Baron Braco, of Kilbryde in the County of Cavan, in 1735, and was created Viscount Macduff at the same time as being raised to the Earldom. Both of these junior titles, though also in the Peerage of Ireland, also referred to places in Scotland, namely Braco and Macduff in Banffshire.

Between 1790 and 1885, the Earls Fife received several additional titles in the  Peerage of Great Britain and of the United Kingdom, respectively, which allowed them to sit and vote in the House of Lords: 
In 1790 the 2nd Earl was created Baron Fife, of the County of Fife, in the Peerage of Great Britain, but this title became extinct on his death in 1809. The 4th Earl was also created Baron Fife, of the County of Fife, in the Peerage of the United Kingdom, in 1827, but again this title became extinct on his death in 1857. The 5th Earl was created Baron Skene, of Skene in the County of Aberdeen, in the Peerage of the United Kingdom, later that year. In 1885, the 6th Earl was created Earl of Fife in the Peerage of the United Kingdom.

In 1889, the 6th Earl Fife was further created Duke of Fife, in Scotland, and Marquess of Macduff, in the County of Banff, in the Peerage of the United Kingdom, two days after his marriage to Princess Louise of Wales, the eldest daughter of Albert Edward, Prince of Wales (the future King Edward VII). When it became clear that he would have no sons, he was further created Duke of Fife and Earl of Macduff, in the County of Banff, also in the Peerage of the United Kingdom, with a special remainder to his daughters and their heirs male.

When the 1st Duke died in 1912, the Earldom became extinct, along with the first Dukedom of Fife, the Marquessate of Macduff, the newer Earldom of Fife, the Viscountcy of Macduff and the Baronies of Braco and Skene. The second Dukedom of Fife and the Earldom of Macduff passed by their special remainders to his daughters and their heirs male. Princess Alexandra of Fife thus succeeded to the new Dukedom of Fife. (See Duke of Fife for the succession to those titles.)

Barons Braco (1735)
William Duff, 1st Baron Braco (c. 1696–1763), created Earl Fife in 1759

Earls Fife (1759)
William Duff, 1st Earl Fife (c. 1696–1763)
James Duff, 2nd Earl Fife (1729–1809)
Alexander Duff, 3rd Earl Fife (1731–1811)
James Duff, 4th Earl Fife (1776–1857)
James Duff, 5th Earl Fife (1814–1879)
Alexander William George Duff, 6th Earl Fife (1849–1912), created  Earl of Fife in 1885 and Duke of Fife in 1889.

See also
Duke of Fife
Earl of Fife

Notes

References

Noble titles created in 1759
Extinct earldoms in the Peerage of Ireland
Fife